Simeone de' Vernacoli (died 1537) was a Roman Catholic prelate who served as Bishop of Pozzuoli (1515–1537).

Biography
On 6 July 1515, Simeone de' Vernacoli was appointed during the papacy of Pope Leo X as Bishop of Pozzuoli.
He served as Bishop of Pozzuoli until his death in 1537.

References

External links and additional sources
 (for Chronology of Bishops)
 (for Chronology of Bishops)

16th-century Italian Roman Catholic bishops
Bishops appointed by Pope Leo X
1537 deaths
Bishops of Pozzuoli